Yusuf Meherally Merchant (23 September 1903 – 2 July 1950) was an Indian freedom fighter and socialist leader. He was elected Mayor of Bombay in 1942 while he was imprisoned in Yerawada Central Prison.

He was the founder of the National Militia, Bombay Youth League and the Congress Socialist Party and played a role in several peasant and trade union movements. He coined the term 'Simon Go Back' 

He coined the term "quit India" and was part of the Quit India Movement along with Mahatma Gandhi for India's last nationwide campaign for independence from the British Empire. He was a participant of underground movement and was in forefront of Quit India Movement.

List of works
 What to Read: A Study Syllabus (1937)
 Leaders of India (1942)
 A Trip to Pakistan (1944)
 The Modern World: A Political Study Syllabus, Part 1 (1945)
 The Price of Liberty (1948)
 Underground Movement(1942)

References 

20th-century Indian Muslims
Quit India Movement
Indian socialists
1903 births
1950 deaths
Mayors of Mumbai
Maharashtra local politicians